Amazing Grace is the fourth full length studio album released by American band The Badlees. It was released on their independent label, Rite-Off Records, in April 1999, just as the band was working to get out of their contract with Universal.

Background
The Badlees recorded their follow-up to the blockbuster River Songs in 1997. The album was called Up There, Down Here and was ready to be published, but the sale of Polygram to Seagram's put all projects on hold indefinitely. Over the final months of 1998 and into 1999, the Badlees played steadily to packed shows in and around Pennsylvania but made little headway with the label that continued to hold them in corporate limbo. They requested, then demanded, then begged the label to either release Up There, Down Here to the public, or release the Badlees from their contract, but got little to no response.

Amazing Grace
Finally, they came up with a radical idea to simply make their own fully produced, full-length album independently and without consent from the label. Bret Alexander was confident that his ever-growing home studio was to the point where they could accomplish this mission sonically. Terry Selders felt that this rash move by the band could not possibly be ignored by the folks at the new Universal Music Group, and was bound to cause some movement one way or another. The band members realized that this action would probably mean the death of Up There, Down Here, as Universal owned the rights to that recording.

The new album, Amazing Grace, was recorded, mixed, mastered, and pressed in just two months at Bret Alexander's home studio. It features the most diverse array of songwriting and voices, as well as styles and moods, and is testament to a true genius that the band possesses, that had been suppressed in recent years.

If you include the already-finished-but-yet-to-be released Up There, Down Here, Pete Palladino sang lead vocals on 56 of the 58 songs that the Badlees had published since 1990, but of the eleven tracks that made up Amazing Grace, Pete would only be the lead singer on four. But on the flipside, Palladino had no individual songwriting credits on any of those previous recordings, but he did have one on this album, a pop gem which he co-wrote with Mike Naydock titled "A Fever", which contains some pristine, soprano vocals in the hook and is reminiscent to some of the higher quality material put out by Tears For Fears in the 1980s.

Jeff Feltenberger wrote "Appalachian Scream", a blue-grass tinged, banjo-driven song on which he performs lead vocals for the first time since the days of Bad Lee White. Paul Smith sings lead vocals for the first time on any Badlees song, with his quirky yet soulful "Ain't No Man", which has a "Roadhouse Blues" feel with a rolling musical interlude and features a heavy dose of piano and B3 organ by guest Robert Scott Richardson. This was one of two songs written by Smith for the album. The other, "Long Good Night", a fast-paced, upbeat, catchy rocker, sung by Palladino, became a crowd favorite at shows and got some regional airplay.

The rest of Amazing Grace is a showcase for Bret Alexander, as a producer, as a performer, and, most especially, as a songwriter. He sings lead vocals on five of these tracks, including the happy, poppy, yet surreal "Poison Ivy", which leads the listener into yet uncharted territory. The tune bounces happily along to a scathing lyric about dealing with necessary evils while trying to reach a goal and features some strategic splashes of instrumentation that range from the vintage sound of down-home banjo to the futuristic surreal textures of an appreciated piano. Although this is one song where Pete Palladino may have been a better choice for vocalist, it remains one of the more interesting songs that the band has ever made.

Where Bret's vocals fit perfectly is on the album's masterpiece, "Amazing Grace to You", a dramatic, frantic song, with wild, unruly guitars and Hammond organ, all to a beat with an odd time signature. It is laced with clever lyrical vignettes delivered in a cool-talking voice during the verse that jumps to a desperate wail during the chorus. This is light years away from Bret's calm crooning in "Time Turns Around", which features a sound that brings the listener to some dark, smoky jazz club in a time long past.

The album is bookended by two more, Alexander-penned tracks. "I'm Not Here Anymore", sung by Palladino, is an unusual but, perhaps, appropriate choice to lead things off with a deep, melancholy mood of the almost whiney guitar, to the beats of marching drums and piano riff. The closing song, "In a Minor Way", is sung by Alexander and straddles the divide between punk/new wave and the guitar-driven pop of the 1960s, in much the same vein as Tom Petty did in the past and The Cellarbirds would in the near future.

Release
Amazing Grace was released on Rite-Off Records on April 2, 1999. The strategy to cause movement at Universal apparently worked, as the Badlees were dropped from the label on the very day that this album was released.

Track listing

Personnel

The Badlees 
 Pete Palladino – Vocals, Harmonica
 Bret Alexander – Guitar, Mandolin, Dobro, Dulcimer, Banjo, Vocals
 Jeff Feltenberger – Acoustic Guitar, Vocals
 Paul Smith – Bass, Keyboards, Vocals
 Ron Simasek – Drums, Percussion

Additional Musicians 
 Robert Scott Richardson - Hammond B-3, Piano
 Dave Baratta - Pedal Steel on "Appalachian Scream"

Production 
 Bret Alexander, Paul Smith - Producers & Engineers
 Tom Borthwick - Engineer at Sound Investments
 Pete Palladino - Photography & Design
 Terry Selders - Manager, One Louder Management
 Larry Mazer - Manager, Entertainment Services
 Scott Berger - Tour Manager
 Keith Barshinger - House Engineer

References
 Modern Rock Review Badlees Profile, October 10, 2010
 The Badlees Archives by Alan K. Stout
 "Amazing Spirit" by Alan K. Stout, Wilkes-Barre Times Leader, April 2, 1999

1999 albums
The Badlees albums